KPOL may refer to:

 KPOL-LP, a defunct low-power radio station (106.9 FM) in Canyonville, Oregon, United States that ceased operations in 2011.
 KPOL (AM), a defunct radio station (1540 AM) in Los Angeles, California, United States from 1952 to 1981
 KPOL (TV), a defunct television station (channel 40) in Tucson, Arizona, United States from 1985 to 1989
 KWHY-TV, a television station (virtual channel 22 / VHF digital 4) licensed to Los Angeles, California, United States, which formerly used the call sign KPOL-TV
 Kwajalein Polarimetric S-band Weather Radar